Frederick Murray McMillan (22 March 1884 – 20 December 1963) was an Australian politician who represented the South Australian House of Assembly seat of Albert from 1921 to 1933. He represented three different parties: the Country Party (1921-1928), the Liberal Federation (1928-1932) and the merged Liberal and Country League (1932-1933).

McMillan was a wheat farmer at Taplin before entering politics, and had served in World War I.

References

 

1884 births
1963 deaths
Members of the South Australian House of Assembly
Liberal and Country League politicians
20th-century Australian politicians